Rio Xufexufe is a river in the island of São Tomé, São Tomé and Príncipe. The river flows southward through the southern part of the Lembá District and empties into the Atlantic Ocean 10 km northwest of Vila Malanza. The endangered birds São Tomé olive pigeon (Columba thomensis) and São Tomé fiscal (Lanius newtoni) have been observed in the catchment of the river.

References

Lembá District
Rivers of São Tomé and Príncipe